Flora Mesoamericana is a comprehensive catalog (a flora) of southern Mexican and Central American plants, written in Spanish. 

The first volume was published in 1994. It is a collaboration between the Missouri Botanical Garden, the National Autonomous University of Mexico, and the Natural History Museum London.

References

Mesoamericana
Botany in Central America
Botany in North America
F
F
Books about Central America
Books about Mexico
1994 non-fiction books
Missouri Botanical Garden